Długie  is a village in the administrative district of Gmina Izbica Kujawska, within Włocławek County, Kuyavian-Pomeranian Voivodeship, in north-central Poland. The village is mostly known as birthplace of Justyna Krzyżanowska, mother of Polish pianist, Fredrick Chopin

References

Villages in Włocławek County